A provisional measure is a legal act in Brazil through which the President of Brazil can, "in important and urgent cases", enact laws effective for a maximum of 60 days without approval by the National Congress. The provisional measure may be renewed once for an additional 60 days, after which, it will cease to be in force unless the National Congress has approved it and made it law. There are two requirements for a provisional measure to be used: urgency and relevance of the matter to be regulated; Provisional measures may not affect:

 political rights
 criminal law
 organization of the Judicial branch
 the budget

 private property

In addition, provisional measures may not effect that which is reserved for complementary law, or is already included in a bill submitted to the president by the National Congress and awaiting approval.

References

External links
 (full text)Constitution of the Federative Republic of Brazil; pdf; 432 pages
Government of Brazil